Niebla  ramosissima is a rare fruticose lichen that grows on soil on San Nicolas Island in the Channel Islands of California.  The epithet, ramosissima, is in reference to the very much branched thallus.

Distinguishing features

Niebla  ramosissima is distinguished by a mat-like, flaccid thallus, very much divided into numerous tangled narrow sublinear-prismatic branches to 16 cm across, the individual branches only 0.5–1.0 mm in diameter, and by containing divaricatic acid, with triterepenes. Niebla juncosa, a species with the same chemistry and similarly shaped branches, which  occurs on the Baja California peninsula, differs by its turgid thallus with larger branches, 2–5 mm in diameter, and further differs in their spreading to erect habit and in their elliptical shape in cross section.

Taxonomic history

Niebla ramosissima was recognized as a result of undertaking a taxonomic revision of the genus in regard to developing a lichen flora of Baja California, which began in 1986. A peer review of the manuscript in 1990 suggested that additional herbarium collections be studied, especially of Niebla on the California mainland and in the Channel Islands. Additional specimens were studied through loans obtained by the United States National Herbarium (Smithsonian Institution, Museum of Natural History, Botany Department) from the University of Colorado at Boulder and from the Santa Barbara Museum of Natural History. Niebla ramossisima was discovered among the borrowed specimens (of Niebla). The species is known only from the holotype (biology).  It was collected by Charis Bratt, 12 February 1993. Niebla ramosissima has also been included under an extremely broad interpretation of Niebla homalea based on the assumptions that morphological variation in Niebla is environmentally induced and that chemical variation represents chemo-syndrome variation; however, this broad interpretation of N. homalea and other related species has inconsistencies in the taxonomic treatment of the genus.

References

External links
World Botanical Associates, Niebla halei, retrieved 22 Dec 2014, http://www.worldbotanical.com/niebla_ramosissima.htm#ramosissima

Lichen species
Lichens of North America
Ramalinaceae
Natural history of the Channel Islands of California
Lichens described in 1996
Taxa named by Richard Wayne Spjut